Balitang Bisdak is a Philippine television news broadcasting show broadcast by GMA Cebu. Originally anchored by Bobby Nalzaro, it premiered on October 4, 1999.  Alan Domingo, Lou-Anne Mae Rondina, and Cecille Quibod-Castro currently serve as the anchors.

Overview
Presented from the studios of GMA TV Cebu, it provides news and features around Cebu City, Metro Cebu, and province of the same name and the rest of Central Visayas including Negros Oriental, Bohol, and Siquijor; as well as Eastern Visayas (including Northern Samar, Western Samar, Eastern Samar, Biliran and Leyte where interviewees speak Waray while Southern Leyte also uses Cebuano, which is spoken by them), through the station's news teams and stringers across the two regions.

The newscast airs every Monday to Friday from 5:00 PM to 5:45 PM on GMA Cebu (TV-7) and via satellite on relay stations GMA TV-10 Tacloban, GMA TV-11 Bohol, GMA TV-5 Dumaguete, GMA TV-5 Calbayog, GMA TV-8 Borongan and GMA TV-12 Ormoc. It is also aired on a slightly-delayed basis over radio station DYSS 999 AM at 6:00 PM.

Balitang Bisdak is also re-aired for national viewers under GTV's late night block "Regional TV Strip" on a weekly basis. It airs every Tuesday at 11:50 PM from May 19, 2020 to July 20, 2021.

The program also airs worldwide on GMA News TV International.

History
The newscast was first aired on Channel 7 in Cebu on October 4, 1999, two years after Bobby Nalzaro left Bombo Radyo Cebu in 1997 and transferred to GMA Cebu as regional news anchor and became a solo anchor of the newscast until 2009 when Atty. Rose Versoza joined in the newscast and stayed until 2015.

To strengthen its commitment of bringing the latest, most credible and most comprehensive news from the region, in July 2013, the newscast started its international broadcast on GMA News TV International alongside other regional newscasts Balitang Amianan (formerly 24 Oras North Central Luzon and 24 Oras Amianan, now One North Central Luzon) and One Mindanao (formerly Testigo, 24 Oras Southern Mindanao and 24 Oras Davao).

Balitang Bisdak ended its 15th year run on November 7, 2014, as it adopts the branding of its now-main newscast 24 Oras into 24 Oras Central Visayas effective November 10.

However, on February 1, 2016, 24 Oras Central Visayas reverted its branding back to Balitang Bisdak, after more than a year hiatus opposite GMA Dagupan's Balitang Amianan.

On November 13, 2017, Balitang Bisdak was relaunched similar to sister newscasts Balitang Amianan and One Mindanao, and it is now available in major parts of Central and Eastern Visayas, by simulcasting the program through its relay stations in Tacloban, Bohol and Ormoc. Co-anchor and veteran correspondent Alan Domingo joined Nalzaro and Quibod-Castro in the anchor team.

Two days after the launch of GMA Regional TV Weekend News (later Regional TV Weekend News, now Regional TV News), on July 29, 2019, Balitang Bisdak updated their graphics and introduced a modified logo and new opening titles patterned with its co-produced national newscast (featuring the sceneries of the program's coverage area). For the first time, the newscast had a more relaxed set-up with couches instead of the tables and chairs that viewers usually see on typical newscasts intending to be an extension of viewers' living room, further connecting the news anchors and the viewers. In addition to the new studio set, Balitang Bisdak opens its doors to the public as it invites viewers to participate as live studio audience every Friday.

On June 29, 2020, the program merged with GMA Iloilo's One Western Visayas due to GMA Regional TV's decision to suspend GMA Cebu's program production due to the increasingly intense situation in Cebu City caused by the COVID-19 pandemic. With that, reports from the newscast delivered in the Cebuano language are then transmitted to the Iloilo station and will be broadcast in the network's regional stations in Western, Central and Eastern Visayas. In interim, the program is de facto named as GMA Regional TV One Western Visayas-Balitang Bisdak newscast. Aside from Cebuano and Waray, the program now uses Filipino on studio presentation alongside Hiligaynon reports from One Western Visayas. This marks the return of a multilingual newscast of the network since GMA Davao's One Mindanao which used Cebuano and Filipino before switching to full Cebuano. On July 2, 2020, Bobby Nalzaro returned as co-anchor. The merger ended on July 10, 2020, when the program returned on July 13 due to the resumption of GMA Cebu's program production. The program also reverted its overall medium of delivery in the Cebuano language

On May 3, 2021, the program added Samar to its coverage area. And with it, comes a new opening billboard.

From March 17 to 21, 2022, the newscast held a tribute for main anchor Nalzaro, who died at the age of 58, leaving Domingo and Quibod-Castro as anchors. Co-anchor and veteran correspondent Lou-Anne Mae Rondina joined the anchor team on May 2, 2022 for the newscast.

Personalities

Anchors
Alan Domingo –  Main Anchor and Correspondent
Lou Anne Mae Rondina –  Co-anchor and Correspondent 
Cecille Quibod-Castro –  Co-Anchor

Correspondents
Nikko Sereno - Sub anchor for Domingo.
Fe Marie Dumaboc - Sub Anchor for Rondina or Castro
Chelo Vallena – Supervising Producer
Mark Regie Abella – Playback Operator
Orchids Lapingcao - Production and Logistics Support/Floor Director

Former personalities
Pablito "Bobby" Nalzaro†
Atty. Rose Versoza
Monching Auxtero
Ana Desamparado
Ara Labra
Jun Veliganio
Mark Anthony Bautista
Bexmae Jumao-as
Greggy Magdadaro
Ching Pelayo
Lalaine Go
Aynee Triumfante
Vic Serna
Ademar Ochotorena
Chona Carreon – Senior Correspondent
Lian Sinculan (now with DYRB Radyo Pilipino 540 Cebu)
Yuri Deldig a.k.a. Yuri Richards† – House Attack segment reporter
Victor Camion – Dumaguete correspondent (now with 89.5 Brigada News FM Dumaguete)
Leo Udtohan – Bohol correspondent (now with 90.3 Radyo Bandera News FM Bohol)
Ronnie Roa – Leyte correspondent (now with 93.5 Brigada News FM Tacloban)

Area of coverage
Cebu
Cebu City
Bohol
Tagbilaran
Negros Oriental
Dumaguete
Siquijor
Siquijor
Eastern Samar
Borongan
Northern Samar
Catarman
Western Samar
Calbayog
Biliran
Naval
Leyte
Tacloban
Southern Leyte
Maasin

Segments
 Alerto (Police News)
 Bisdak Sports (Sports News)
 Flash Report (Breaking News)
 Huli Cam (Reports on footages in CCTV)
 Newsstand (Other Reports)
 Ronda Waray (Other Reports in Eastern Visayas)
 Serbisyong Puso (Public Service)
 Showbiz Kini (Entertainment News)
 GMA Regional TV Presents (Special Reports)
 Extra
 Extra Income (Money News)
 Bida Ka 
 Hanepbuhay
 Bisdak Bae
 Good News 
 Reklamo, Ipa-Bisdak mo! (Complaint News)
 Balitang Barangay (Community News)
 Batang Bisdak (Kiddie News)
 Manglaag Ta! (Travel News)
 Lami Syah!/Food Trip (Food News)
 Lahi Rah (Viral News)
 Hayop sa Balita (Animal News)
 Dagan sa Panahon (Weather News)
 #SpreadKindness
 'Sa Maaan? (Questions)
 Kwento ng Pilipino (Story News)

References

External links
 

1999 Philippine television series debuts
GMA Network news shows
GMA Integrated News and Public Affairs shows
Philippine television news shows
Television in Cebu City